Roberto Capparelli Coringrato (November 18, 1923 – 2000) was an Argentine football forward who played for Bolivia in the 1950 FIFA World Cup. He also played for The Strongest.

Overview 
Capparelli spent his most successful years playing for The Strongest, being part of the team that won the 194546 Bolivian Primera División. In 1948 he was traded to Club Litoral that won the La Paz Football Association (LPFA) treble in 1947–49. The club also represented Bolivia in the South American Championship of Champions held in Chile in 1948, where Capparelli was also the topscorer of tournament.

In 1949 Capparelli returned to The Strongest and one year after he was called-up for the Bolivia national team to compete at the 1950 FIFA World Cup. Capparelli had been naturalised Bolivian along with fellow countryman Antonio Grecco.

References

External links

FIFA profile

1923 births
2000 deaths
Argentine emigrants to Bolivia
Naturalized citizens of Bolivia
Argentine people of Italian descent
Bolivian people of Italian descent
Bolivian footballers
Bolivia international footballers
Association football forwards
Club Deportivo Litoral (La Paz) players
The Strongest players
1950 FIFA World Cup players